KLMR-FM (93.5 MHz) is a radio station which is currently silent, but previously broadcast a hot adult contemporary music format. The station, which operated from 1978 to 2022, was licensed to serve Lamar, Colorado, United States. KLMR-FM was last owned by Aaron Leiker, through licensee 25-7 Media, Inc.

History
The original construction permit for the station was issued to KLMR, Inc. on August 4, 1976, and issued the KLMR-FM call sign on October 26, 1976. The station signed on in November 1978 and was licensed on March 12, 1979. On October 25, 1982, the station changed its call sign to KSEC, on November 17, 1999, to KSNZ, and on May 26, 2004, back to KLMR-FM.

On June 11, 2018, KLMR-FM changed its format from classic rock to hot adult contemporary, branded as "93.5 The Heat".

The station's studios, co-located with the transmitter for its AM sister station, were destroyed in a microburst on July 23, 2022. While KLMR-FM would resume operations from makeshift facilities in the conference room of KVAY, described by the stations' chief engineer Kit Haskins as an "engineering nightmare", 25/7 Media subsequently elected to shut the station down on September 20, 2022, and surrender the KLMR-FM and KLMR licenses; the closure left KVAY, whose owner Bob DeLancey had a 33 percent interest in 25/7 Media, as the only commercial FM station in Lamar. That October, the KLMR licenses were reinstated, with 25/7 Media instead requesting special temporary authority to keep the two stations silent for financial reasons.On January 2, 2023, it was announced that Riverside Communications LLC had purchased KLMR 920 and KLMR-FM from 25/7 Media for $30,000. Riverside plans to rebuild and return the stations to operational status, with a tentative launch date of early 2023.

Previous logo

References

External links

LMR-FM
Radio stations established in 1978
1978 establishments in Colorado